Golden Lion is a 2015 novel by Wilbur Smith and Giles Kristian. It is part of the Courtney series of novels.

It was the first of sixteen novels Smith did with a co-writer.

Smith says he sketched out the storyline and characters but another person wrote it. He said, "I have a particular way of writing, and they have their way. I take their sentences or chapters and I put the Wilbur Smith gloss on them... It's spelled m...a...g...i...c. Magic! Everyone has their own magic and I have my particular magic that I have developed very carefully over the past 50 years."

References

External links
Golden Lion at Wilbur Smith
Review at Kirkus reviews

Novels by Wilbur Smith
2015 novels
HarperCollins books